Amuwo-Odofin is a local government area (LGA) in the Badagry Division, Lagos State, Nigeria.

Amuwo Odofin LGA is divided into Oriade and Amuwo Local Council Development Area (LCDA) with 7 wards each; Abule-osun, Agboju, Ibeshe, Ijegun, Irede, Kirikir and Kuje wards constitute Oriade LCDA and Ado-soba, Ekoakete, Ifelodun, Ilado Tamaro, Irepodun, Odofin and Orire wards comprising Amuwo LCDA.

Spread among the 14 wards are 67 communities, 12 of which are Urban, 8 semi-urban and 47 rural. Amuwo Odofin LGA has a population density of approximately 300,000 people per square kilometer.

The LGA, with a population of over 1,500,000 according to the 2006 Census shares its boundaries with Ajeromi and Ifelodun LCDA in the East, Oriade LCDA in the West, the Badagry Creek to the South and Isolo/Igando LCDA to the North.

The Activities of Amuwo Odofin 
The indigenous dwellers of Amuwo Odofin are mainly the Aworis. Some of the festivals embraced by the people are Elegba, Oro, Sangbeto and Igunuko festivals. The custodians of culture and tradition in the area are the traditional rulers. The Local Government is blessed with highly reputable Obas and Chiefs and Baales. This includes Oba Mobadenle Obalade Oyekan- the Onilado of Ilado/Inagbe Islands and Oba Lateef Olayinka Ado, Fabuwa 1, Alado of Ado Land.

Nonetheless, considering its location as a near border Local Government, International trade has found its root in the area with people of various extractions engaging in various forms of trading activities. It must also be stated that the Igbos account for more than half of the area's total population.

Amuwo Odofin and Coronavirus 
Amuwo-Odofin was regarded as one of the areas with a high rate of coronavirus in Lagos state. Coronavirus  was detected in this Local Government Area, among eight people who had confirmed cases. To reduce the spread of coronavirus, the Nigerian Centre for Disease Control (NCDC), doctors, and other health doctors were posted to the local government. Amuwo-Odofin was also listed as one of the 88 healthcare facilities, the Lagos state government accredited for the vaccination of coronavirus. The COVID-19 vaccines made available for the residents were AstraZeneca vaccines.

In a bid to stop the spread of the virus, all the sporting activities and centers in the area were stopped to prevent the spread. The bars and clubs were also closed up, due to the spread of the virus. Hence, coronavirus awareness and medical outreach were offered to the Shoba community of Amuwo Odofin, Lagos State. The ban on the bars and clubs as well as the sporting centers was emphasized and everyone was urged to comply with the guidelines and take responsibility for protecting themselves against the virus as directed by the NCDC. The virus was no respecter of gender, age, or status.

Meanwhile, a voice note reported that the residents of the Amuwo-Odofin local government area (AOLG) were infected by the coronavirus. This was posted on all the social media platforms which caused concern in the area. However, the NCDC and the local government administration denied the claim. They organized a press conference where the Chairman of the Council stated that “the person who recorded the audio – who he identified as Dr. Faith Anyanwu – is neither a staff of the Lagos State Government nor that of the NCDC.”

On coronavirus palliative, the food items that were meant to reduce hunger for the residents of the Amuwo-Odofin were packed at the warehouse on Benster Crescent, also known as Monkey Village in the Mazamaza area of the local government. The warehouse was looted of the COVID-19 palliatives. The palliatives were food items meant to get across to different groups of people in the area. The items included bags of rice, macaroni, spaghetti, salt, garri, sugar, and cartons of noodles. The Lagos State Government condemned the looting, stating the palliatives were donated by the Private Sector Coalition against COVID-19. The vandalization of the warehouse in search of food led to unrest and protest in the areas. The unrest continued, causing the looting and burning down of banks, police stations, local government secretariats, television station, newspaper office, shopping malls, court, and many others.

When coronavirus was controlled, the markets in Amuwo-Odofin were allowed to open for business but the market leaders signed an undertaking, agreeing to comply with all the safety protocols to stop the spread.

Flooding in Amuwo Odofin 
The communities in Amuwo-Odofin local government area are prone to flooding because of blocked drainages and the terrain. A published research in a journal reported that Amuwo Odofin has a rate of 10 percent risk zone of being flooded and 50 percent risk of the total area. The finding related the risk to being close to the bodies of water and having low terrains. Thus, the areas experience flooding whenever it rains. Residents are advised to be more careful whenever it rains to avoid being washed away and meeting with other flooding issues, especially the blocked drainages. It has been noted that properties worth millions of naira have been destroyed by floods in Amuwo-Odofin and other areas in Lagos state.

A flood consultant and environmental risk researcher, Taiwo Ogunwumi, stated that to manage flooding, the flood early warning communication, accurate flood susceptibility map, use of proper land use regulation, planning and management, need for afforestation and programs that support tree planting, use of the presence of mangroves and wetlands should be available and accessible to the people before the rain sets in. 

In 2017, the Nigerian Society of Engineers (NSE), the Victoria Island branch, during its conference recommended good management of flooding in some areas of Lagos. They called on other professional bodies like the environmentalists, sociologists, lawyers, engineers and economists to join in seeking sustainable solutions to flooding issues.

Meanwhile, the Lagos State Government proposed to relocating of residents of the Mile 2 area in Amuwo-Odofin local government area for the construction and the management of the area against flood. Some of the areas have been controlled from flooding which made the federal government to nominate it as the most climate change-friendly local government in the country. The nomination synchronized with the 16th edition of the United Nations global on Conference on climate change also known as Conference of Parties, (COP 16) scheduled for November 29 to December 10, 2010. Thus, Amuwo-Odofin local government area was appointed to advocate for friendly climate conditions across the continent.

References

Local Government Areas in Lagos State
Populated coastal places in Lagos State
Local Government Areas in Yorubaland